The 1931–32 Greek Football Cup was the first edition of the Greek Football Cup. The competition culminated with the Greek Cup Final, held at Leoforos Alexandras Stadium, on 8 November 1931. The match was contested by AEK Athens and Aris, with AEK Athens winning by 5–3.

Calendar

Qualification round

|}

Knockout phase
In the knockout phase, teams play against each other over a single match. If the match ends up as a draw, extra time will be played and if the match remains a draw at the end of the extra time a replay match is set. That procedure will be repeated until a winner occurs. There are no seedings, any teams can be drawn against each other.

Bracket

Round of 16

|}

Quarter-finals

|}

Semi-finals

|}

Final

The 1st Greek Cup Final was played at the Leoforos Alexandras Stadium.

References

External links
Greek Cup 1931-32 at RSSSF

Greek Football Cup seasons
Greek Cup
Cup